Paul Alexander Gray is an American football safety who is currently a free agent. He played college football at Appalachian State.

Professional career
Gray signed with the Tampa Bay Buccaneers as an undrafted free agent on May 1, 2017. He was waived on July 30, 2017. On March 11, 2019, Gray was assigned to the Columbus Destroyers. He was assigned to the Destroyers again on May 6, 2019.

References

External links
Appalachian State Mountaineers bio

1993 births
Living people
People from Suwanee, Georgia
Sportspeople from the Atlanta metropolitan area
Players of American football from Georgia (U.S. state)
Appalachian State Mountaineers football players
Tampa Bay Buccaneers players
Columbus Destroyers players